Pseudocolaspis coerulea is a species of leaf beetle of Senegal, described by François-Louis Laporte in 1833.

References

Eumolpinae
Beetles of Africa
Beetles described in 1833
Taxa named by François-Louis Laporte, comte de Castelnau
Insects of West Africa